Raymond Berry Oakley III (April 4, 1948 – November 11, 1972) was an American bassist and one of the founding members of the Allman Brothers Band, known for long melodic bass runs. He is ranked number 46 on the Bass Player magazine's list of "The 100 Greatest Bass Players of All Time". He was posthumously inducted into the Rock and Roll Hall of Fame as a member of the Allman Brothers Band in 1995.

Biography
Oakley was born in Chicago, Illinois, raised in the suburb of Park Forest, Illinois, then moved to Florida where he met and joined Dickey Betts's band, the Blues Messengers, later called Second Coming. He was a founding member of The Allman Brothers Band in 1969, along with guitarists Betts and Duane Allman, singer and keyboardist Gregg Allman, and drummers and percussionists Butch Trucks and Jai Johanny "Jaimoe" Johanson.

When Duane Allman died in a motorcycle accident on October 29, 1971, Oakley was devastated.

Equipment
Oakley's bass guitar, nicknamed "The Tractor Bass", was a Fender Jazz Bass with a Guild Bisonic bass pickup (manufactured by Hagström, a Swedish company).

Death and tribute
On November 11, 1972, Oakley had a motorcycle accident in Macon, Georgia, just three blocks from where Duane Allman had his fatal motorcycle accident the year before. Oakley was riding around a sharp right bend of the road on Napier Avenue at Inverness when he crossed the line and collided at an angle with a city bus making the bend from the opposite direction. After striking the front and then the back of the bus, Oakley was thrown from his motorcycle, just as Allman had been, and struck his head. Oakley declined medical treatment after the accident and caught a ride home. Three hours later he was rushed back to the hospital, delirious and in pain, and died of cerebral swelling caused by a fractured skull. Attending doctors stated that even if Oakley had gone straight to the hospital from the scene of the accident, he could not have been saved. He was 24 years old when he died, the same age as Duane Allman.

In 1998, the Georgia State Legislature passed a resolution designating a bridge on State Highway 19/U.S. Route 41 in Macon, Georgia, as the "Raymond Berry Oakley III Bridge." At the same time, the road carried by the bridge was named Duane Allman Boulevard. The resolution stated that the names were designated "in honor and remembrance of the late founding members of the Allman Brothers Band."

Discography
The Allman Brothers Band
The Allman Brothers Band (1969)
Idlewild South (1970)
At Fillmore East (1971)
Eat a Peach (1972)
Brothers and Sisters (1973) tracks 1 & 2

References

External links
 The Hoochie Coochie Man – John Ogden
 Georgia House of Representatives SR653, designating Duane Allman Boulevard and Raymond Berry Oakley Bridge
 Account of the fatal accident
 

1948 births
1972 deaths
American rock bass guitarists
American male bass guitarists
The Allman Brothers Band members
Motorcycle road incident deaths
Road incident deaths in Georgia (U.S. state)
Guitarists from Chicago
American male guitarists
20th-century American bass guitarists
20th-century American male musicians
Blues rock musicians